Lamiaceae (  or Labiatae are a family of flowering plants in the order Lamiales commonly known as the mint or deadnettle or sage family. Many of the plants are aromatic in all parts and include widely used culinary herbs. Some species are shrubs, trees (such as teak), or, rarely, vines. The family has a cosmopolitan distribution. The enlarged Lamiaceae contain about 236 genera and have been stated to contain 6,900 to 7,200 species, but the World Checklist lists 7,534.

23,420 species of vascular plant have been recorded in South Africa, making it the sixth most species-rich country in the world and the most species-rich country on the African continent. Of these, 153 species are considered to be threatened. Nine biomes have been described in South Africa: Fynbos, Succulent Karoo, desert, Nama Karoo, grassland, savanna, Albany thickets, the Indian Ocean coastal belt, and forests.

The 2018 South African National Biodiversity Institute's National Biodiversity Assessment plant checklist lists 35,130 taxa in the phyla Anthocerotophyta (hornworts (6)), Anthophyta (flowering plants (33534)), Bryophyta (mosses (685)), Cycadophyta (cycads (42)), Lycopodiophyta (Lycophytes(45)), Marchantiophyta (liverworts (376)), Pinophyta (conifers (33)), and Pteridophyta (cryptogams (408)).

49 genera are represented in the literature. Listed taxa include species, subspecies, varieties, and forms as recorded, some of which have subsequently been allocated to other taxa as synonyms, in which cases the accepted taxon is appended to the listing. Multiple entries under alternative names reflect taxonomic revision over time.

Acrocephalus 
Genus Acrocephalus:
 Acrocephalus sericeus Briq. accepted as Haumaniastrum sericeum (Briq.) A.J.Paton

Acrotome 
Genus Acrotome:
 Acrotome angustifolia G.Taylor, indigenous
 Acrotome hispida Benth. indigenous
 Acrotome inflata Benth. indigenous
 Acrotome pallescens Benth. indigenous
 Acrotome thorncroftii Skan, indigenous

Aeollanthus 
Genus Aeollanthus:
 Aeollanthus buchnerianus Briq. indigenous
 Aeollanthus neglectus (Dinter) Launert, indigenous
 Aeollanthus parvifolius Benth. indigenous
 Aeollanthus rehmannii Gurke, indigenous
 Aeollanthus suaveolens Mart. ex Spreng. indigenous

Ajuga 
Genus Ajuga:
 Ajuga ophrydis Burch. ex Benth. indigenous

Ballota 
Genus Ballota:
 Ballota africana (L.) Benth. indigenous

Basilicum 
Genus Basilicum:
 Basilicum polystachyon (L.) Moench, indigenous

Becium 
Genus Becium:
 Becium angustifolium (Benth.) N.E.Br. accepted as Ocimum angustifolium Benth. present
 Becium burchellianum (Benth.) N.E.Br. accepted as Ocimum burchellianum Benth. present
 Becium citriodorum S.D.Will. & K.Balkwill, accepted as Ocimum dolomiticola A.J.Paton, present
 Becium coddii S.D.Will. & K.Balkwill, accepted as Ocimum coddii (S.D.Will. & K.Balkwill) A.J.Paton, present
 Becium filamentosum (Forssk.) Chiov. accepted as Ocimum filamentosum Forssk. present
 Becium grandiflorum (Lam.) Pic.Serm. var. galpinii (Gurke) Sebald, accepted as Ocimum obovatum E.Mey. ex Benth. subsp. obovatum var. galpinii, present
 Becium grandiflorum (Lam.) Pic.Serm. var. obovatum (E.Mey. ex Benth.) Sebald, accepted as Ocimum obovatum E.Mey. ex Benth. subsp. obovatum var. obovatum, present
 Becium reclinatum S.D.Will. & K.Balkwill, accepted as Ocimum reclinatum (S.D.Will. & K.Balkwill) A.J.Paton, present
 Becium waterbergensis S.D.Will. & K.Balkwill, accepted as Ocimum waterbergense (S.D.Will. & K.Balkwill) A.J.Paton, present

Cantinoa 
Genus Cantinoa:
 Cantinoa americana (Aubl.) Harley & J.F.B.Pastore, not indigenous, naturalised
 Cantinoa mutabilis (Rich.) Harley & J.F.B.Pastore, not indigenous, naturalised

Cedronella 
Genus Cedronella:
 Cedronella canariensis (L.) Webb & Berthel. not indigenous, cultivated, naturalised, invasive

Clerodendrum 
Genus Clerodendrum:
 Clerodendrum africanum Moldenke, endemic
 Clerodendrum bungei Steud. not indigenous, naturalised, invasive
 Clerodendrum caeruleum N.E.Br. accepted as Rotheca caerulea (N.E.Br.) P.P.J.Herman & Retief, indigenous
 Clerodendrum cuneatum Gurke, accepted as Rotheca cuneiformis (Moldenke) P.P.J.Herman & Retief, indigenous
 Clerodendrum cuneiforme Moldenke, accepted as Rotheca cuneiformis (Moldenke) P.P.J.Herman & Retief, indigenous
 Clerodendrum dekindtii Gurke, accepted as Rotheca myricoides (Hochst.) Steane & Mabb. 
 Clerodendrum discolor (Klotzsch) Vatke var. oppositifolium E.Thomas, accepted as Rotheca myricoides (Hochst.) Steane & Mabb. present
 Clerodendrum glabrum E.Mey. accepted as Volkameria glabra (E.Mey.) Mabb. & Y.W.Yuan, present
 Clerodendrum hirsutum (Hochst.) H.Pearson, accepted as Rotheca hirsuta (Hochst.) R.Fern. indigenous
 Clerodendrum hirsutum (Hochst.) H.Pearson var. ciliatum H.Pearson, accepted as Rotheca hirsuta (Hochst.) R.Fern. indigenous
 Clerodendrum louwalbertsii P.P.J.Herman, accepted as Rotheca louwalbertsii (P.P.J.Herman) P.P.J.Herman & Retief, indigenous
 Clerodendrum myricoides (Hochst.) Vatke, accepted as Rotheca myricoides (Hochst.) Steane & Mabb. indigenous
 Clerodendrum natalense Gurke, accepted as Rotheca hirsuta (Hochst.) R.Fern. forma triphylla (Harv.) Fernald, indigenous
 Clerodendrum pearsonii Moldenke, accepted as Rotheca hirsuta (Hochst.) R.Fern. indigenous
 Clerodendrum pilosum H.Pearson, accepted as Rotheca pilosa (H.Pearson) P.P.J.Herman & Retief, indigenous
 Clerodendrum pleiosciadium Gurke, indigenous
 Clerodendrum scheffleri Gurke var. ellipticum Moldenke, accepted as Rotheca cuneiformis (Moldenke) P.P.J.Herman & Retief, indigenous
 Clerodendrum schlechteri Gurke, accepted as Rotheca myricoides (Hochst.) Steane & Mabb. present
 Clerodendrum simile H.Pearson, accepted as Clerodendrum ternatum Schinz, indigenous
 Clerodendrum suffruticosum Gurke, accepted as Rotheca suffuticosa (Gurke) Verdc. indigenous
 Clerodendrum suffruticosum Gurke var. natalense Moldenke, accepted as Rotheca suffuticosa (Gurke) Verdc. indigenous
 Clerodendrum ternatum Schinz, indigenous
 Clerodendrum transvaalense B.Thomas, accepted as Clerodendrum ternatum Schinz, endemic
 Clerodendrum triphyllum (Harv.) H.Pearson, accepted as Rotheca hirsuta (Hochst.) R.Fern. forma triphylla (Harv.) Fernald, indigenous
 Clerodendrum triphyllum (Harv.) H.Pearson forma hirsutum (Hochst.) R.Fern. accepted as Rotheca hirsuta (Hochst.) R.Fern. 
 Clerodendrum triphyllum (Harv.) H.Pearson var. ciliatum (H.Pearson) Moldenke, accepted as Rotheca hirsuta (Hochst.) R.Fern. indigenous
 Clerodendrum triphyllus Hiern ex S.Moore forma angustissimum Moldenke, accepted as Rotheca hirsuta (Hochst.) R.Fern. forma triphylla (Harv.) Fernald, indigenous
 Clerodendrum triphyllus Hiern ex S.Moore var. vernum B.Thomas, accepted as Rotheca hirsuta (Hochst.) R.Fern. forma triphylla (Harv.) Fernald, indigenous
 Clerodendrum uncinatum Schinz, accepted as Kalaharia uncinata (Schinz) Moldenke, indigenous
 Clerodendrum violaceum Gurke, accepted as Rotheca violacea (Gurke) Verdc. indigenous
 Clerodendrum wildii Moldenke, accepted as Rotheca wildii (Moldenke) R.Fern. indigenous
 Clerodendrum wildii Moldenke forma glabrum R.Fern. accepted as Rotheca wildii (Moldenke) R.Fern. forma glabra (R.Fern.) R.Fern. indigenous
 Clerodendrum wilmsii Gurke, accepted as Clerodendrum ternatum Schinz, indigenous

Cyclonema 
Genus Cyclonema:
 Cyclonema hirsutum Hochst. accepted as Rotheca hirsuta (Hochst.) R.Fern. indigenous
 Cyclonema myricoides (Hochst.) Hochst. accepted as Rotheca myricoides (Hochst.) Steane & Mabb. indigenous
 Cyclonema triphyllum Harv. accepted as Rotheca hirsuta (Hochst.) R.Fern. forma triphylla (Harv.) Fernald, indigenous

Endostemon 
Genus Endostemon:
 Endostemon obtusifolius (E.Mey. ex Benth.) N.E.Br. indigenous
 Endostemon tenuiflorus (Benth.) M.Ashby, indigenous
 Endostemon tereticaulis (Poir.) M.Ashby, indigenous

Geniosporum 
Genus Geniosporum:
 Geniosporum angolense Briq. accepted as Platostoma rotundifolium (Briq.) A.J.Paton, present

Hemizygia 
Genus Hemizygia:
 Hemizygia albiflora (N.E.Br.) M.Ashby, accepted as Syncolostemon albiflorus (N.E.Br.) D.F.Otieno, indigenous
 Hemizygia bolusii (N.E.Br.) Codd, accepted as Syncolostemon bolusii (N.E.Br.) D.F.Otieno, endemic
 Hemizygia bracteosa (Benth.) Briq. accepted as Syncolostemon bracteosus (Benth.) D.F.Otieno, indigenous
 Hemizygia canescens (Gurke) M.Ashby, accepted as Syncolostemon canescens (Gurke) D.F.Otieno, indigenous
 Hemizygia cinerea Codd, accepted as Syncolostemon cinereum (Codd) D.F.Otieno & Retief, indigenous
 Hemizygia elliottii (Baker) M.Ashby, accepted as Syncolostemon elliottii (Baker) D.F.Otieno, indigenous
 Hemizygia floccosa Launert, accepted as Syncolostemon floccosus (Launert) D.F.Otieno 
 Hemizygia foliosa S.Moore, accepted as Syncolostemon foliosus (S.Moore) D.F.Otieno, indigenous
 Hemizygia gerrardii (N.E.Br.) M.Ashby, accepted as Syncolostemon gerrardii (N.E.Br.) D.F.Otieno, endemic
 Hemizygia hoepfneri Briq. accepted as Syncolostemon bracteosus (Benth.) D.F.Otieno 
 Hemizygia incana Codd, accepted as Syncolostemon incanus (Codd) D.F.Otieno, endemic
 Hemizygia linearis (Benth.) Briq. accepted as Syncolostemon linearis (Benth.) D.F.Otieno, indigenous
 Hemizygia macrophylla (Gurke) Codd, accepted as Syncolostemon macrophyllus Gurke, endemic
 Hemizygia modesta Codd, accepted as Syncolostemon modestus (Codd) D.F.Otieno, indigenous
 Hemizygia obermeyerae M.Ashby, accepted as Syncolostemon obermeyerae (M.Ashby) D.F.Otieno, endemic
 Hemizygia parvifolia Codd, accepted as Syncolostemon parvifolius (Codd) D.F.Otieno, endemic
 Hemizygia persimilis (N.E.Br.) M.Ashby, accepted as Syncolostemon persimilis (N.E.Br.) D.F.Otieno, indigenous
 Hemizygia petiolata M.Ashby, accepted as Syncolostemon petiolatus (M.Ashby) D.F.Otieno, indigenous
 Hemizygia petrensis (Hiern) M.Ashby, accepted as Syncolostemon canescens (Gurke) D.F.Otieno, indigenous
 Hemizygia pretoriae (Gurke) M.Ashby subsp. heterotricha Codd, accepted as Syncolostemon pretoriae (Gurke) D.F.Otieno, indigenous
 Hemizygia pretoriae (Gurke) M.Ashby subsp. pretoriae, accepted as Syncolostemon pretoriae (Gurke) D.F.Otieno, indigenous
 Hemizygia punctata Codd, accepted as Syncolostemon punctatus (Codd) D.F.Otieno, endemic
 Hemizygia ramosa Codd, accepted as Syncolostemon ramosus (Codd) D.F.Otieno, endemic
 Hemizygia rehmannii (Gurke) M.Ashby, accepted as Syncolostemon rehmannii (Gurke) D.F.Otieno, endemic
 Hemizygia rugosifolia M.Ashby, accepted as Syncolostemon rugosifolius (M.Ashby) D.F.Otieno, endemic
 Hemizygia serrata Briq. accepted as Syncolostemon bracteosus (Benth.) D.F.Otieno 
 Hemizygia stalmansii A.J.Paton & K.Balkwill, accepted as Syncolostemon stalmansii (A.J.Paton & K.Balkwill) D.F.Otieno, indigenous
 Hemizygia stenophylla (Gurke) M.Ashby, accepted as Syncolostemon stenophyllus (Gurke) D.F.Otieno, endemic
 Hemizygia subvelutina (Gurke) M.Ashby, accepted as Syncolostemon subvelutinus (Gurke) D.F.Otieno, endemic
 Hemizygia teucriifolia (Hochst.) Briq. accepted as Syncolostemon teucriifolius (Hochst.) D.F.Otieno, endemic
 Hemizygia thorncroftii (N.E.Br.) M.Ashby, accepted as Syncolostemon thorncroftii (N.E.Br.) D.F.Otieno, indigenous
 Hemizygia transvaalensis (Schltr.) M.Ashby, accepted as Syncolostemon transvaalensis (Schltr.) D.F.Otieno, indigenous

Hoslundia 
Genus Hoslundia:
 Hoslundia opposita Vahl, indigenous

Isodon 
Genus Isodon:
 Isodon calycinus (Benth.) H.W.Li, accepted as Rabdosiella calycina (Benth.) Codd, indigenous

Kalaharia 
Genus Kalaharia:
 Kalaharia spinipes Baill. accepted as Kalaharia uncinata (Schinz) Moldenke, indigenous
 Kalaharia uncinata (Schinz) Moldenke, indigenous

Karomia 
Genus Karomia:
 Karomia speciosa (Hutch. & Corbishley) R.Fern. indigenous
 Karomia speciosa (Hutch. & Corbishley) R.Fern. forma flava (Moldenke) R.Fern. indigenous
 Karomia speciosa (Hutch. & Corbishley) R.Fern. forma speciosa, indigenous

Killickia 
Genus Killickia:
 Killickia compacta (Killick) Brauchler, Heubl & Doroszenko, endemic
 Killickia grandiflora (Killick) Brauchler, Heubl & Doroszenko, endemic
 Killickia lutea Brauchler, endemic
 Killickia pilosa (Benth.) Brauchler, Heubl & Doroszenko, endemic

Lamium 
Genus Lamium:
 Lamium amplexicaule L. not indigenous, naturalised, invasive
 Lamium galeobdolon Crantz, not indigenous, cultivated, naturalised

Lasiocorys 
Genus Lasiocorys:
 Lasiocorys capensis Benth. accepted as Leonotis pentadentata J.C.Manning & Goldblatt, indigenous

Leonotis 
Genus Leonotis:
 Leonotis capensis (Benth.) J.C.Manning & Goldblatt, accepted as Leonotis pentadentata J.C.Manning & Goldblatt, indigenous
 Leonotis dubia E.Mey. indigenous
 Leonotis intermedia Lindl. indigenous
 Leonotis leonurus (L.) R.Br. indigenous
 Leonotis nepetifolia (L.) R.Br. indigenous
 Leonotis ocymifolia (Burm.f.) Iwarsson, indigenous
 Leonotis ocymifolia (Burm.f.) Iwarsson var. raineriana (Vis.) Iwarsson, accepted as Leonotis ocymifolia (Burm.f.) Iwarsson, present
 Leonotis ocymifolia (Burm.f.) Iwarsson var. schinzii (Gurke) Iwarsson, accepted as Leonotis schinzii Gurke, present
 Leonotis pentadentata J.C.Manning & Goldblatt, indigenous
 Leonotis randii S.Moore, indigenous
 Leonotis schinzii Gurke, indigenous

Leucas 
Genus Leucas:
 Leucas capensis (Benth.) Engl. accepted as Leonotis pentadentata J.C.Manning & Goldblatt, indigenous
 Leucas ebracteata Peyr. var. kaokoveldensis Sebald, accepted as Leonotis ebracteata (Peyr.) J.C.Manning & Goldblatt var. kaokoveldensis (Sebald) J.C.Manning & Goldb 
 Leucas glabrata (Vahl) Sm. accepted as Leonotis glabrata (Vahl) J.C.Manning & Goldblatt, present
 Leucas glabrata (Vahl) Sm. var. glabrata, accepted as Leonotis glabrata (Vahl) J.C.Manning & Goldblatt var. glabrata, indigenous
 Leucas glabrata (Vahl) Sm. var. linearis Codd, accepted as Leonotis glabrata (Vahl) J.C.Manning & Goldblatt var. linearis (Codd) J.C.Manning & Goldblatt, endemic
 Leucas lavandulifolia Sm. endemic
 Leucas martinicensis (Jacq.) R.Br. accepted as Leonotis martinicensis (Jacq.) J.C.Manning & Goldblatt, indigenous
 Leucas neuflizeana Courbon, accepted as Leonotis neuflizeana (Courbon) J.C.Manning & Goldblatt, indigenous
 Leucas pechuelii (Kuntze) Gurke, accepted as Leonotis pechuelii (Kuntze) J.C.Manning & Goldblatt 
 Leucas sexdentata Skan, accepted as Leonotis sexdentata (Skan) J.C.Manning & Goldblatt, indigenous

Marrubium 
Genus Marrubium:
 Marrubium vulgare L. not indigenous, naturalised

Mentha 
Genus Mentha:
 Mentha aquatica L. indigenous
 Mentha longifolia (L.) Huds. indigenous
 Mentha longifolia (L.) Huds. subsp. capensis (Thunb.) Briq. indigenous
 Mentha longifolia (L.) Huds. subsp. polyadena (Briq.) Briq. indigenous
 Mentha longifolia (L.) Huds. subsp. wissii (Launert) Codd, indigenous
 Mentha pulegium L. not indigenous, cultivated, naturalised, invasive

Mesosphaerum 
Genus Mesosphaerum:
 Mesosphaerum pectinatum (L.) Kuntze, not indigenous, naturalised

Ocimum 
Genus Ocimum:
 Ocimum americanum L. indigenous
 Ocimum americanum L. var. americanum, indigenous
 Ocimum angustifolium Benth. indigenous
 Ocimum burchellianum Benth. endemic
 Ocimum canum Sims, accepted as Ocimum americanum L. var. americanum, present
 Ocimum coddii (S.D.Will. & K.Balkwill) A.J.Paton, endemic
 Ocimum dolomiticola A.J.Paton, indigenous
 Ocimum filamentosum Forssk. indigenous
 Ocimum gratissimum L. indigenous
 Ocimum gratissimum L. subsp. gratissimum var. gratissimum, indigenous
 Ocimum labiatum (N.E.Br.) A.J.Paton, indigenous
 Ocimum natalense Ayob. ex A.J.Paton, indigenous
 Ocimum obovatum E.Mey. ex Benth. indigenous
 Ocimum obovatum E.Mey. ex Benth. subsp. obovatum var. galpinii, indigenous
 Ocimum obovatum E.Mey. ex Benth. subsp. obovatum var. obovatum, indigenous
 Ocimum pseudoserratum (M.Ashby) A.J.Paton, endemic
 Ocimum reclinatum (S.D.Will. & K.Balkwill) A.J.Paton, endemic
 Ocimum serratum (Schltr.) A.J.Paton, indigenous
 Ocimum tubiforme (R.D.Good) A.J.Paton, endemic
 Ocimum urticifolium Roth subsp. caryophyllatum Codd, accepted as Ocimum natalense Ayob. ex A.J.Paton, present
 Ocimum urticifolium Roth subsp. urticifolium, accepted as Ocimum gratissimum L. subsp. gratissimum var. gratissimum, present
 Ocimum waterbergense (S.D.Will. & K.Balkwill) A.J.Paton, endemic
 Ocimum x africanum  Lour. indigenous

Orthosiphon 
Genus Orthosiphon:
 Orthosiphon amabilis (Bremek.) Codd, accepted as Ocimum labiatum (N.E.Br.) A.J.Paton, present
 Orthosiphon fruticosus Codd, endemic
 Orthosiphon gerrardii N.E.Br. accepted as Syncolostemon gerrardii (N.E.Br.) D.F.Otieno, endemic
 Orthosiphon heterophyllus Gurke, accepted as Syncolostemon subvelutinus (Gurke) D.F.Otieno, present
 Orthosiphon labiatus N.E.Br. accepted as Ocimum labiatum (N.E.Br.) A.J.Paton, present
 Orthosiphon natalensis Gurke, accepted as Syncolostemon pretoriae (Gurke) D.F.Otieno, present
 Orthosiphon pseudoserratus M.Ashby, accepted as Ocimum pseudoserratum (M.Ashby) A.J.Paton, present
 Orthosiphon rubicundus (D.Don) Benth. indigenous
 Orthosiphon serratus Schltr. accepted as Ocimum serratum (Schltr.) A.J.Paton, present
 Orthosiphon suffrutescens (Thonn.) J.K.Morton, indigenous
 Orthosiphon thymiflorus (Roth) Sleesen, indigenous
 Orthosiphon tubiformis R.D.Good, accepted as Ocimum tubiforme (R.D.Good) A.J.Paton, present

Platostoma 
Genus Platostoma:
 Platostoma rotundifolium (Briq.) A.J.Paton, indigenous

Plectranthus 
Genus Plectranthus:
 Plectranthus aliciae (Codd) Van Jaarsv. & T.J.Edwards, endemic
 Plectranthus ambiguus (Bolus) Codd, indigenous
 Plectranthus amboinicus (Lour.) Spreng. indigenous
 Plectranthus barbatus Andrews, not indigenous, naturalised
 Plectranthus barbatus Andrews var. grandis (L.H.Cramer) Lukhoba & A.J.Paton, not indigenous, naturalised, invasive
 Plectranthus brevimentum T.J.Edwards, endemic
 Plectranthus caninus Roth, indigenous
 Plectranthus ciliatus E.Mey. ex Benth. indigenous
 Plectranthus cylindraceus Hochst. ex Benth. accepted as Plectranthus montanus Benth. indigenous
 Plectranthus dolichopodus Briq. endemic
 Plectranthus dolomiticus Codd, endemic
 Plectranthus ecklonii Benth. endemic
 Plectranthus elegantulus Briq. endemic
 Plectranthus ernstii Codd, endemic
 Plectranthus esculentus N.E.Br. indigenous
 Plectranthus fruticosus L'Her. indigenous
 Plectranthus grallatus Briq. indigenous
 Plectranthus grandidentatus Gurke, indigenous
 Plectranthus hadiensis (Forssk.) Schweinf. ex Spreng. indigenous
 Plectranthus hadiensis (Forssk.) Schweinf. ex Spreng. var. hadiensis, indigenous
 Plectranthus hadiensis (Forssk.) Schweinf. ex Spreng. var. tomentosus (Benth.) Codd, indigenous
 Plectranthus hadiensis (Forssk.) Schweinf. ex Spreng. var. woodii (Gurke) Codd, endemic
 Plectranthus hereroensis Engl. indigenous
 Plectranthus hilliardiae Codd, endemic
 Plectranthus hilliardiae Codd subsp. australis Van Jaarsv. & A.E.van Wyk, indigenous
 Plectranthus hilliardiae Codd subsp. hilliardiae, indigenous
 Plectranthus laxiflorus Benth. indigenous
 Plectranthus lucidus Van Jaarsv. & T.J.Edwards, endemic
 Plectranthus madagascariensis (Pers.) Benth. indigenous
 Plectranthus madagascariensis (Pers.) Benth. var. aliciae Codd, accepted as Plectranthus aliciae (Codd) Van Jaarsv. & T.J.Edwards, present
 Plectranthus madagascariensis (Pers.) Benth. var. madagascariensis, indigenous
 Plectranthus madagascariensis (Pers.) Benth. var. ramosior Benth. accepted as Plectranthus ramosior (Benth.) Van Jaarsv. indigenous
 Plectranthus malvinus Van Jaarsv. & T.J.Edwards, endemic
 Plectranthus montanus Benth. indigenous
 Plectranthus mutabilis Codd, endemic
 Plectranthus mzimvubensis Van Jaarsv. endemic
 Plectranthus neochilus Schltr. indigenous
 Plectranthus oertendahlii T.C.E.Fr. endemic
 Plectranthus oribiensis Codd, endemic
 Plectranthus ornatus Codd, not indigenous, naturalised
 Plectranthus pentheri (Gurke) Van Jaarsv. & T.J.Edwards, endemic
 Plectranthus petiolaris E.Mey. ex Benth. endemic
 Plectranthus porcatus Van Jaarsv. & P.J.D.Winter, endemic
 Plectranthus praetermissus Codd, endemic
 Plectranthus psammophilus Codd, endemic
 Plectranthus purpuratus Harv. indigenous
 Plectranthus purpuratus Harv. subsp. montanus Van Jaarsv. & T.J.Edwards, endemic
 Plectranthus purpuratus Harv. subsp. purpuratus, indigenous
 Plectranthus purpuratus Harv. subsp. tongaensis Van Jaarsv. & T.J.Edwards, endemic
 Plectranthus ramosior (Benth.) Van Jaarsv. endemic
 Plectranthus reflexus Van Jaarsv. & T.J.Edwards, endemic
 Plectranthus rehmannii Gurke, endemic
 Plectranthus rubropunctatus Codd, indigenous
 Plectranthus saccatus Benth. indigenous
 Plectranthus saccatus Benth. subsp. pondoensis Van Jaarsv. & Milstein, endemic
 Plectranthus saccatus Benth. var. longitubus Codd, endemic
 Plectranthus saccatus Benth. var. saccatus, endemic
 Plectranthus spicatus E.Mey. ex Benth. indigenous
 Plectranthus strigosus Benth. indigenous
 Plectranthus stylesii T.J.Edwards, endemic
 Plectranthus swynnertonii S.Moore, indigenous
 Plectranthus tetensis (Baker) Agnew, indigenous
 Plectranthus tetragonus Gurke, indigenous
 Plectranthus venteri Van Jaarsv. & Hankey, endemic
 Plectranthus verticillatus (L.f.) Druce, indigenous
 Plectranthus xerophilus Codd, endemic
 Plectranthus zuluensis T.Cooke, indigenous

Premna 
Genus Premna:
 Premna mooiensis (H.Pearson) W.Piep. indigenous

Prunella 
Genus Prunella:
 Prunella vulgaris L. not indigenous, naturalised, invasive

Pycnostachys 
Genus Pycnostachys:
 Pycnostachys reticulata (E.Mey.) Benth. indigenous
 Pycnostachys urticifolia Hook. indigenous

Rabdosiella 
Genus Rabdosiella:
 Rabdosiella calycina (Benth.) Codd, indigenous
 Rabdosiella leemannii N.Hahn, indigenous

Rotheca 
Genus Rotheca:
 Rotheca caerulea (N.E.Br.) P.P.J.Herman & Retief, endemic
 Rotheca cuneiformis (Moldenke) P.P.J.Herman & Retief, endemic
 Rotheca hirsuta (Hochst.) R.Fern. indigenous
 Rotheca hirsuta (Hochst.) R.Fern. forma hirsuta, indigenous
 Rotheca hirsuta (Hochst.) R.Fern. forma triphylla (Harv.) Fernald, indigenous
 Rotheca louwalbertsii (P.P.J.Herman) P.P.J.Herman & Retief, indigenous
 Rotheca myricoides (Hochst.) Steane & Mabb. indigenous
 Rotheca myricoides (Hochst.) Steane & Mabb. subsp. myricoides var. myricoides, indigenous
 Rotheca pilosa (H.Pearson) P.P.J.Herman & Retief, endemic
 Rotheca suffuticosa (Gurke) Verdc. indigenous
 Rotheca uncinata (Schinz) P.P.J.Herman & Retief, accepted as Kalaharia uncinata (Schinz) Moldenke, indigenous
 Rotheca violacea (Gurke) Verdc. indigenous
 Rotheca wildii (Moldenke) R.Fern. indigenous
 Rotheca wildii (Moldenke) R.Fern. forma glabra (R.Fern.) R.Fern. indigenous

Salvia 
Genus Salvia:
 Salvia africana-caerulea L. endemic
 Salvia africana-lute L. endemic
 Salvia albicaulis Benth. endemic
 Salvia aurita L.f. indigenous
 Salvia aurita L.f. var. aurita, endemic
 Salvia aurita L.f. var. galpinii (Skan) Hedge, indigenous
 Salvia chamelaeagnea P.J.Bergius, endemic
 Salvia coccinea Etl. not indigenous, naturalised
 Salvia dentata Aiton, indigenous
 Salvia disermas L. indigenous
 Salvia dolomitica Codd, endemic
 Salvia garipensis E.Mey. ex Benth. indigenous
 Salvia granitica Hochst. endemic
 Salvia lanceolata Lam. indigenous
 Salvia muirii L.Bolus, endemic
 Salvia namaensis Schinz, indigenous
 Salvia obtusata Thunb. endemic
 Salvia radula Benth. indigenous
 Salvia reflexa Hornem. not indigenous, naturalised, invasive
 Salvia repens Burch. ex Benth. indigenous
 Salvia repens Burch. ex Benth. var. keiensis Hedge, endemic
 Salvia repens Burch. ex Benth. var. repens, indigenous
 Salvia repens Burch. ex Benth. var. transvaalensis Hedge, indigenous
 Salvia runcinata L.f. indigenous
 Salvia scabra L.f. endemic
 Salvia schlechteri Briq. endemic
 Salvia sclarea L. not indigenous, cultivated, naturalised, invasive
 Salvia stenophylla Burch. ex Benth. indigenous
 Salvia stenophylla Burch. ex Benth. var. subintegra Skan, accepted as Salvia stenophylla Burch. ex Benth. indigenous
 Salvia thermarum Van Jaarsv. endemic
 Salvia tiliifolia Vahl, not indigenous, naturalised, invasive
 Salvia triangularis Thunb. endemic
 Salvia tysonii Skan, endemic
 Salvia verbenaca L. not indigenous, naturalised, invasive

Satureja 
Genus Satureja:
 Satureja biflora (Buch.-Ham. ex D.Don) Briq. indigenous
 Satureja compacta Killick, accepted as Killickia compacta (Killick) Brauchler, Heubl & Doroszenko, endemic
 Satureja grandibracteata Killick, accepted as Killickia grandiflora (Killick) Brauchler, Heubl & Doroszenko, endemic
 Satureja reptans Killick, accepted as Killickia pilosa (Benth.) Brauchler, Heubl & Doroszenko, endemic

Scutellaria 
Genus Scutellaria:
 Scutellaria racemosa Pers. not indigenous, naturalised

Siphonanthus 
Genus Siphonanthus:
 Siphonanthus myricoides (Hochst.) Hiern, accepted as Rotheca myricoides (Hochst.) Steane & Mabb. indigenous
 Siphonanthus triphyllus Hiern ex S.Moore, accepted as Rotheca hirsuta (Hochst.) R.Fern. forma triphylla (Harv.) Fernald, indigenous

Solenostemon 
Genus Solenostemon:
 Solenostemon latifolius (Hochst. ex Benth.) J.K.Morton, indigenous
 Solenostemon rotundifolius (Poir.) J.K.Morton, indigenous

Spironema 
Genus Spironema:
 Spironema myricoides Hochst. accepted as Rotheca myricoides (Hochst.) Steane & Mabb. indigenous

Stachys 
Genus Stachys:
 Stachys aethiopica L. indigenous
 Stachys albiflora N.E.Br. endemic
 Stachys arachnoidea Codd, indigenous
 Stachys arvensis L. not indigenous, naturalised
 Stachys aurea Benth. indigenous
 Stachys bolusii Skan, endemic
 Stachys burchelliana Launert, indigenous
 Stachys caffra E.Mey. ex Benth. endemic
 Stachys comosa Codd, endemic
 Stachys cuneata Banks ex Benth. endemic
 Stachys cymbalaria Briq. endemic
 Stachys dregeana Benth. indigenous
 Stachys erectiuscula Gurke, endemic
 Stachys flavescens Benth. endemic
 Stachys flexuosa Skan, endemic
 Stachys graciliflora C.Presl, indigenous
 Stachys grandifolia E.Mey. ex Benth. indigenous
 Stachys humifusa Burch. ex Benth. endemic
 Stachys hyssopoides Burch. ex Benth. indigenous
 Stachys kuntzei Gurke, indigenous
 Stachys lamarckii Benth. indigenous
 Stachys linearis Burch. ex Benth. indigenous
 Stachys malacophylla Skan, endemic
 Stachys natalensis Hochst. indigenous
 Stachys natalensis Hochst. var. galpinii (Briq.) Codd, indigenous
 Stachys natalensis Hochst. var. natalensis, indigenous
 Stachys nigricans Benth. indigenous
 Stachys obtusifolia MacOwan, endemic
 Stachys rehmannii Skan, endemic
 Stachys reticulata Codd, endemic
 Stachys rivularis J.M.Wood & M.S.Evans, endemic
 Stachys rudatisii Skan, endemic
 Stachys rugosa Aiton, indigenous
 Stachys scabrida Skan, endemic
 Stachys sessilifolia E.Mey. ex Benth. endemic
 Stachys sessilis Gurke, indigenous
 Stachys simplex Schltr. indigenous
 Stachys spathulata Burch. ex Benth. indigenous
 Stachys sublobata Skan, endemic
 Stachys thunbergii Benth. endemic
 Stachys tubulosa MacOwan, indigenous
 Stachys tysonii Skan, indigenous
 Stachys zeyheri Skan, endemic

Syncolostemon 
Genus Syncolostemon:
 Syncolostemon albiflorus (N.E.Br.) D.F.Otieno, indigenous
 Syncolostemon argenteus N.E.Br. indigenous
 Syncolostemon aurulentus Ngwenya, endemic
 Syncolostemon bolusii (N.E.Br.) D.F.Otieno, endemic
 Syncolostemon bracteosus (Benth.) D.F.Otieno, indigenous
 Syncolostemon canescens (Gurke) D.F.Otieno, indigenous
 Syncolostemon cinereum (Codd) D.F.Otieno & Retief, indigenous
 Syncolostemon concinnus N.E.Br. indigenous
 Syncolostemon densiflorus Benth. indigenous
 Syncolostemon elliottii (Baker) D.F.Otieno, indigenous
 Syncolostemon eriocephalus I.Verd. indigenous
 Syncolostemon foliosus (S.Moore) D.F.Otieno, indigenous
 Syncolostemon gerrardii (N.E.Br.) D.F.Otieno, endemic
 Syncolostemon incanus (Codd) D.F.Otieno, endemic
 Syncolostemon latidens (N.E.Br.) Codd, endemic
 Syncolostemon linearis (Benth.) D.F.Otieno, indigenous
 Syncolostemon macranthus (Gurke) M.Ashby, endemic
 Syncolostemon macrophyllus Gurke, endemic
 Syncolostemon modestus (Codd) D.F.Otieno, indigenous
 Syncolostemon obermeyerae (M.Ashby) D.F.Otieno, endemic
 Syncolostemon parviflorus E.Mey. ex Benth. indigenous
 Syncolostemon parviflorus E.Mey. ex Benth. var. lanceolatus (Gurke) Codd, endemic
 Syncolostemon parviflorus E.Mey. ex Benth. var. parviflorus, indigenous
 Syncolostemon parvifolius (Codd) D.F.Otieno, endemic
 Syncolostemon persimilis (N.E.Br.) D.F.Otieno, indigenous
 Syncolostemon petiolatus (M.Ashby) D.F.Otieno, indigenous
 Syncolostemon pretoriae (Gurke) D.F.Otieno, indigenous
 Syncolostemon punctatus (Codd) D.F.Otieno, endemic
 Syncolostemon ramosus (Codd) D.F.Otieno, endemic
 Syncolostemon ramulosus E.Mey. ex Benth. endemic
 Syncolostemon rehmannii (Gurke) D.F.Otieno, endemic
 Syncolostemon rotundifolius E.Mey. ex Benth. endemic
 Syncolostemon rugosifolius (M.Ashby) D.F.Otieno, endemic
 Syncolostemon stalmansii (A.J.Paton & K.Balkwill) D.F.Otieno, indigenous
 Syncolostemon stenophyllus (Gurke) D.F.Otieno, endemic
 Syncolostemon subvelutinus (Gurke) D.F.Otieno, endemic
 Syncolostemon teucriifolius (Hochst.) D.F.Otieno, indigenous
 Syncolostemon thorncroftii (N.E.Br.) D.F.Otieno, indigenous
 Syncolostemon transvaalensis (Schltr.) D.F.Otieno, indigenous

Tetradenia 
Genus Tetradenia:
 Tetradenia bainesii (N.E.Br.) Phillipson & C.F.Steyn, indigenous
 Tetradenia barberae (N.E.Br.) Codd, endemic
 Tetradenia brevispicata (N.E.Br.) Codd, indigenous
 Tetradenia galpinii (N.E.Br.) Phillipson & C.F.Steyn, indigenous
 Tetradenia riparia (Hochst.) Codd, indigenous
 Tetradenia tuberosa T.J.Edwards, endemic

Teucrium 
Genus Teucrium:
 Teucrium africanum Thunb. endemic
 Teucrium kraussii Codd, indigenous
 Teucrium trifidum Retz. indigenous

Thorncroftia 
Genus Thorncroftia:
 Thorncroftia greenii Changwe & K.Balkwill, endemic
 Thorncroftia longiflora N.E.Br. indigenous
 Thorncroftia lotterii T.J.Edwards, endemic
 Thorncroftia media Codd, endemic
 Thorncroftia succulenta (R.A.Dyer & E.A.Bruce) Codd, endemic
 Thorncroftia thorncroftii (S.Moore) Codd, indigenous

Tinnea 
Genus Tinnea:
 Tinnea barbata Vollesen, indigenous
 Tinnea galpinii Briq. indigenous
 Tinnea rhodesiana S.Moore, indigenous

Vitex 
Genus Vitex:
 Vitex amboniensis Gurke, accepted as Vitex ferruginea Schumach. & Thonn. present
 Vitex ferruginea Schumach. & Thonn. indigenous
 Vitex ferruginea Schumach. & Thonn. subsp. amboniensis (Gurke) Verdc. var. amaniensis, accepted as Vitex ferruginea Schumach. & Thonn. present
 Vitex ferruginea Schumach. & Thonn. subsp. amboniensis (Gurke) Verdc. var. amboniensis, accepted as Vitex ferruginea Schumach. & Thonn. present
 Vitex harveyana H.Pearson, indigenous
 Vitex mooiensis H.Pearson, accepted as Premna mooiensis (H.Pearson) W.Piep. indigenous
 Vitex mooiensis H.Pearson var. rudolphii H.Pearson, accepted as Premna mooiensis (H.Pearson) W.Piep. indigenous
 Vitex obovata E.Mey. indigenous
 Vitex obovata E.Mey. subsp. obovata, indigenous
 Vitex obovata E.Mey. subsp. wilmsii (Gurke) Bredenk. & D.J.Botha, indigenous
 Vitex patula E.A.Bruce, indigenous
 Vitex pooara Corbishley, endemic
 Vitex rehmannii Gurke, indigenous
 Vitex rehmannii Gurke forma submentosa Moldenke, accepted as Vitex rehmannii Gurke, indigenous
 Vitex trifolia L. not indigenous, naturalised, invasive
 Vitex wilmsii Gurke var. reflexa (H.Pearson) W.Piep. accepted as Vitex obovata E.Mey. subsp. obovata, present
 Vitex wilmsii Gurke var. wilmsii, accepted as Vitex obovata E.Mey. subsp. wilmsii (Gurke) Bredenk. & D.J.Botha, present
 Vitex zeyheri Sond. indigenous

Volkameria 
Genus Volkameria:
 Volkameria glabra (E.Mey.) Mabb. & Y.W.Yuan, indigenous

References

South African plant biodiversity lists
Lamiaceae